Playalinda Beach (Playa Linda - Spanish for "pretty beach") is a beach located on Florida's east coast in Canaveral National Seashore near Titusville, Florida.

Beach information 

Playalinda is considered a surfing location by many of the locals.

Playalinda is accessible from Titusville, Florida. The beach is currently open to the public daily between 6:00 am to 8:00 pm. Access to the beach may be closed periodically in preparation for rocket launches from Cape Canaveral Space Force Station or the Kennedy Space Center, which are just south of Playalinda Beach.

Canaveral National Seashore has concurrent jurisdiction with both the state of Florida and its counties of Volusia and Brevard. Federal, State and County law enforcement officers may enforce any and all respective laws/ordinances that do not conflict with Federal laws and regulations.

Brevard County has an ordinance that prohibits nudity in public places. Playalinda Beach is within the jurisdiction of Brevard County thus the nudity ordinance is enforceable by county and state law officers as well as federal park rangers. The laws are rarely or erratically enforced, however, affording the beach a de facto clothing-optional status. This is only at the last parking location parking lot #13.

Park fees 
 Per vehicle : $20.00 per day
 Motorcycles: $15.00 per day
 Walk-in fee : $10.00 per day (bicycles, pedestrians, occupants of large non-commercial vehicles).
 CANA/MINWR annual pass: $40 (Valid at Canaveral National Seashore and Merritt Island Wildlife Refuge.
 America the Beautiful annual pass: $80 is available to anyone; gives access to more than 2,000 federal recreation sites.
 Senior pass: $80.00 Lifetime

Free entrance days, 2021 

Jan 18, 2021: Birthday of Martin Luther King, Jr.
Apr 17, 2021: First day of National Park Week
Aug 4, 2021: One year anniversary of the Great American Outdoors Act
Aug 25, 2021: National Park Service Birthday
Sep 25, 2021: National Public Lands Day
Nov 11, 2021: Veterans Day

Geography 

Playalinda Beach is on a barrier island separate from the mainland by the Indian River. Canaveral National Seashore's  of shoreline is the longest stretch of undeveloped public beach on the east coast of Florida.

The barrier island is a thin ribbon of sand lying between the ocean and Mosquito Lagoon. Unlike many barrier islands with primary and secondary dunes, Playalinda has only a single dune. The island provides an important buffer against tropical storms and hurricanes, absorbing the initial brunt of wind and waves.

References

External links 
Surf Conditions at Playalinda Beach
Canaveral National Seashore
Shuttle Countdown
Naturist links
Central Florida Naturists

Beaches of Brevard County, Florida
Titusville, Florida
Protected areas of Brevard County, Florida
Beaches of Florida